The Pamplin Media Group (PMG) is a media conglomerate owned by Robert B. Pamplin, Jr. and operating primarily in the Portland metropolitan area in the U.S. state of Oregon. As of 2019, the company owns 25 newspapers and employs 200 people.

History 
The Portland Tribune newspaper, founded by Pamplin in 2001, is the largest newspaper in the group. PMG also includes a group of newspapers formerly known as Community Newspapers, Incorporated, serving the Portland area. Most of them are published once a week. The company launched the Hillsboro Tribune in September 2012. As of 2009, it owned newspapers in Multnomah, Washington, Clackamas, and Columbia counties. On January 8, 2013, it bought five newspapers from Eagle Newspapers, Inc. in the Portland area (Canby Herald, Wilsonville Spokesman, Molalla Pioneer, The Newberg Graphic, and the Woodburn Independent), along with The Madras Pioneer in Central Oregon. In June 2013, it also purchased the Central Oregonian from Eagle.

In 2014, Pamplin partnered with the EO Media Group, which publishes the East Oregonian and several other weekly and monthly publications in Oregon, to form the Oregon Capital Bureau and publish the Oregon Capital Insider newsletter. The partnership came as the number of reporters assigned to state capital bureaus nationwide was on the decline. 

In 2018, the newly-launched Salem Reporter joined the bureau, and its publisher, Les Zaitz, was assigned to lead its three reporters. The Salem Reporter left the cooperative in early 2020 and Zaitz left the operation. The Oregon Capital Bureau as of late winter 2020 includes just the EO Media Group and Pamplin.

On July 19, 2022, digital editor Geoff Pursinger published a column announcing Pamplin would no longer host online comments on the articles published to its websites starting Aug. 1.

Each chain writes and edits its own stories and shares them with each other and several subscribers, including newspapers in Medford, Corvallis, and Albany.

Newspapers

References

External links

 
Mass media in Oregon
Companies based in Milwaukie, Oregon
Publishing companies based in Oregon
2001 establishments in Oregon
Publishing companies established in 2001
Mass media companies established in 2001
American companies established in 2001